The following is a list of notable deaths in October 2017.

Entries for each day are listed alphabetically by surname. A typical entry lists information in the following sequence:
 Name, age, country of citizenship at birth, subsequent country of citizenship (if applicable), what subject was noted for, cause of death (if known), and reference.

October 2017

1
Olivier Baudry, 44, French footballer (Sochaux), cancer.
Hansje Bunschoten, 59, Dutch Olympic swimmer (1972) and television presenter, complications from breast cancer.
Pierluigi Cappello, 50, Italian poet, Viareggio Prize laureate (2010).
Dao Shixun, 89, Chinese politician.
Bob Deacon, 73, British social scientist.
Edward B. Giller, 99, American USAF major general.
Robert D. Hales, 85, American religious leader (LDS Church).
Andy Hopkins, 67, American football player (Hamilton Tiger-Cats).
Arthur Janov, 93, American psychologist (The Primal Scream), complications from a stroke.
Hugh Kearney, 93, British historian.
Butch Lenton, 61, Australian councillor and community advocate, mayor of the Shire of Winton (since 2012), cancer.
František Listopad, 95, Czech-born Portuguese poet, prose writer and director.
Donald James Mackinnon, 88, Australian politician, member of the Victorian Legislative Assembly for Box Hill (1976–1982).
Edmond Maire, 86, French labor union leader, secretary general of CFDT (1971–1988).
István Mészáros, 86, Hungarian Marxist philosopher (Socialism or Barbarism) and professor (University of Sussex).
Muktar Muhammed, 72, Nigerian military officer, Governor of Kaduna (1977–1978), cancer.
Angelika Muharukua, 59, Namibian Herero politician, MP (since 1995).
Samuel Irving Newhouse Jr., 89, American publisher (Advance Publications) and businessman.
Stephen Paddock, 64, American gunman (2017 Las Vegas shooting), suicide by gunshot.
José Pratas, 59, Portuguese football referee.
Philippe Rahmy, 52, Swiss poet and writer, Swiss Literature Awards laureate (2017).
Eliu Rivera, 73, Puerto Rican activist and politician.
Dave Strader, 62, American sportscaster (Dallas Stars, Detroit Red Wings, Phoenix Coyotes), cholangiocarcinoma.
John Swinburne, 87, Scottish politician, founder of SSCUP and member of Parliament (2003–2007).
Larissa Volpert, 91, Russian-Estonian philologist and chess Woman Grandmaster, Soviet women's chess champion (1954, 1958, 1959).

2
Peter Burke, 90, New Zealand rugby union player (Taranaki, national team).
Warren Burton, 72, American actor (All My Children, Gettysburg, Green Lantern).
Evangelina Elizondo, 88, Mexican actress, artist and singer.
Robert Elsie, 67, Canadian-born German Albanologist, linguist and translator, motor neuron disease.
Solly Hemus, 94, American baseball player and manager (St. Louis Cardinals, Philadelphia Phillies).
Klaus Huber, 92, Swiss composer and academic.
Azra Kolaković, 40, Bosnian pop singer, uterine cancer.
Edwin N. Lightfoot, 92, American biochemical engineer.
Friedrich von Löffelholz, 62, German Olympic time trials cyclist (1976) and university lecturer.
Hanumant Moreshwar Marathe, 77, Indian writer and journalist.
Edward Mhinga, 89, South African politician, Chief Minister of Gazankulu (1993).
Øyvin Norborg, 78, Norwegian newspaper editor.
Simon Ostrach, 93, American scientist.
Paul Otellini, 66, American businessman, CEO of Intel (2005–2013).
Antonio Pantojas, 68, Puerto Rican actor, dancer, playwright and female impersonator, heart attack.
Jim Patterson, 67, American politician, member of the Alabama House of Representatives (since 2010), heart attack.
Marcel Germain Perrier, 84, French Roman Catholic prelate, Bishop of Pamiers (2000–2008).
Tom Petty, 66, American Hall of Fame musician (Tom Petty and the Heartbreakers, Traveling Wilburys) and voice actor (King of the Hill), accidental drug overdose.
Jean Roesser, 87, American politician, member of the Maryland Senate (1995–2003), complications of leukemia.
Patrocinio Samudio, 42, Paraguayan footballer, heart attack.
Neil Smelser, 87, American sociologist.
Barbara Tisserat, 66, American lithographer, lung cancer.
Robert Yates, 74, American racing team owner (Yates Racing), NASCAR Winston Cup champion (1999), liver cancer.

3
Rodney Bickerstaffe, 72, British trade unionist, General Secretary of NUPE (1982–1993) and UNISON (1996–2001).
Robert Henry Bragg Jr., 98, American physicist.
Ming Chang, 85, Chinese-born American naval officer.
Curtis Ford Jr., 95, American politician, member of the Texas House of Representatives (1953–1957).
Bob Gannon, 58, American politician, member of the Wisconsin State Assembly (since 2015).
Chittani Ramachandra Hegde, 84, Indian Yakshagana artist, stroke.
John Herrnstein, 79, American baseball player (Philadelphia Phillies, Chicago Cubs, Atlanta Braves).
Norm Jamison, 67, Canadian politician, member of the Legislative Assembly of Ontario (1990–1995), liver cancer.
Ninja Jorgensen, 77, American Olympic volleyball player.
Michel Jouvet, 91, French oneirologist and neurobiologist, developer of Modafinil and discoverer of REM sleep.
Isabella Karle, 95, American scientist, brain tumor.
Kim Un-yong, 86, South Korean sports administrator, President of World Taekwondo Federation (1973–2004).
Jack Laver, 100, Australian cricketer.
André Lévy, 91, French sinologist and translator.
Victorino Martín Andrés, 88, Spanish breeder of fighting bulls, stroke.
Francesco Martino, 80, Italian politician, President of Sicily (1993–1995).
Les Mutrie, 66, English footballer (Hull City), cancer.
Dieter Nörr, 86, German scholar of ancient law.
Lance Russell, 91, American professional wrestling announcer and commentator (CWA, USWA, WCW), complications from a broken hip.
Jalal Talabani, 83, Iraqi-Kurdish politician, Prime Minister (2003) and President (2005–2014), cerebral hemorrhage.
Norma Williams, 88, New Zealand swimmer, British Empire Games silver medallist (1950).

4
Davoud Ahmadinejad, 67, Iranian politician, heart attack.
Lawrence Argent, 60, British-born American sculptor, cardiac arrest.
Atiqa Bano, 77, Indian educationist and curator.
Vivian Castleberry, 95, American journalist and newspaper editor.
Bronisław Chromy, 92, Polish sculptor (Wawel Dragon).
Liam Cosgrave, 97, Irish politician, Taoiseach (1973–1977).
Lyudmila Gureyeva, 74, Ukrainian-born Russian volleyball player, Olympic silver medalist (1964).
Rufus Hannah, 63, American advocate for homeless rights, traffic collision.
Janis Hansen, 74, American singer and author, myelofibrosis and acute myeloid leukemia.
Karel Kolář, 61, Czech athlete, European Indoor champion (1979).
Edward Mazurek, 78, American politician, member of the Maine House of Representatives (2004–2012), and Maine Senate (2012–2014).
John Miller, 79, American politician, member of the U.S. House of Representatives for Washington's 1st congressional district (1985–1993), cancer.
Jesús Mosterín, 76, Spanish anthropologist and philosopher of science, lung cancer.
Richard Paris, 75, Australian Olympic cyclist (1964).
Jerry Ross, 84, American producer and songwriter ("I'm Gonna Make You Love Me"), founder of Heritage and Colossus Records, prostate cancer.
Keith Schmidt, 95, Australian cricketer.
Yosihiko H. Sinoto, 93, Japanese-born American anthropologist (Hane excavation).
William Tepper, 69, American actor (Bachelor Party, Drive, He Said) and screenwriter (Grilled), heart attack.
Barry Thomas, 85, American sound engineer (Days of Heaven, Witness, 7th Heaven), stroke.

5
Heley de Abreu Silva Batista, 43, Brazilian teacher (Janaúba Tragedy), burns.
Armin Delong, 92, Czech physicist.
Ruth Escobar, 81, Portuguese-born Brazilian actress (The Jew) and politician, founder of Teatro Ruth Escobar.
Kelly Gage, 92, American attorney and politician, member of the Minnesota Senate (1967–1972).
Toon Geurts, 85, Dutch sprint canoer, Olympic silver medalist (1964).
Georges Griffiths, 27, Ivorian footballer (Lombard-Pápa, Diósgyőr, national U-23 team), shot.
Ted Haley, 96, American politician and surgeon.
Dan Hanganu, 78, Romanian-born Canadian architect.
Nora Johnson, 84, American author.
Eberhard van der Laan, 62, Dutch politician and lawyer, Minister for Housing, Communities and Integration (2008–2010), Mayor of Amsterdam (since 2010), lung cancer.
António de Macedo, 86, Portuguese filmmaker, esotericism writer and professor.
Trevor Martin, 87, Scottish actor (Doctor Who and the Daleks in the Seven Keys to Doomsday, Coronation Street, Babel).
Kurt Mislow, 94, German-born American chemist.
Peter Plouviez, 86, British trade union leader, General Secretary of Equity (1974–1991).
Giorgio Pressburger, 80, Hungarian-born Italian writer, Viareggio Prize laureate (1998).
Anna Stewart, 53, British businesswoman, CEO of Laing O'Rourke (2013–2015), non-executive director of Babcock International (since 2012).
Sylke Tempel, 54, German journalist and writer, struck by a tree.
François Xavier Nguyên Van Sang, 85, Vietnamese Roman Catholic prelate, Bishop of Thái Bình (1990–2009).
Bilat Paswan Vihangam, 77, Indian writer and politician.
Anne Wiazemsky, 70, French actress (Au Hasard Balthazar, La Chinoise) and writer, breast cancer.

6
Roberto Anzolin, 79, Italian footballer (Juventus, national team).
Tarnia Baker, 50, South African politician, member of the National Assembly (since 2014), traffic collision.
Brian Bannon, 87, Australian politician, member of the New South Wales Legislative Assembly for Rockdale (1959–1986).
Holly Block, 58, American museologist, gallery director in Art in General (1988–2004) and Director of Bronx Museum of the Arts (since 2006), breast cancer.
Terry Downes, 81, British boxer, world champion (1961–1962) and actor (The Fearless Vampire Killers, Caravaggio).
Darsi Ferrer Ramírez, 47, Cuban journalist, doctor and Castro dissident, prisoner of conscience (2009–2010).
Gao Mang, 90–91, Chinese translator.
Lou Gare, 78, English jazz saxophonist.
Marek Gołąb, 77, Polish weightlifter, Olympic bronze medalist (1968).
Connie Hawkins, 75, American Hall of Fame basketball player (Harlem Globetrotters, Pittsburgh Pipers, Phoenix Suns).
Hervé L. Leroux, 60, French fashion designer, founder of Hervé Leger, ruptured aneurysm.
David Marks, 64, British architect and entrepreneur, co-designer of London Eye and British Airways i360 observation tower.
Ralphie May, 45, American comedian (Last Comic Standing), cardiac arrest.
Ian McNeill, 85, Scottish football player (Aberdeen) and manager (Ross County, Wigan Athletic).
Mary Moore, 87, British author and diplomat.
Angelo Munzone, 84, Italian politician, Mayor of Catania (1982–1984).
Dick Roeding, 86, American politician, member of the Kentucky Senate (1991–2009).
Bunny Sigler, 76, American songwriter and record producer (The O'Jays, The Roots, Patti LaBelle), heart attack.
Judy Stone, 93, American film critic and author (San Francisco Chronicle, The New York Times, Los Angeles Times).
Ray Turnbull, 78, Canadian curler, world championship silver medalist (1965), pneumonia.

7
Kazys Almenas, 82, Lithuanian physicist, engineer and publisher.
Hugo Budinger, 90, German field hockey player, Olympic bronze medalist (1956).
George Dempsey, 88, American basketball player (Philadelphia Warriors).
Hugo Dollheiser, 90, German field hockey player, Olympic bronze medalist (1956).
Vyacheslav Ivanov, 88, Russian philologist and semiotician, co-developer of glottalic theory.
Jan Arvid Johansen, 70, Norwegian musician, cancer.
Ole Krarup, 82, Danish politician, MEP (1994–2007).
Jim Landis, 83, American baseball player (Chicago White Sox), cancer.
Óscar Lara Aréchiga, 65, Mexican politician.
Cosimo Mele, 60, Italian politician, Deputy (2006–2008), Mayor of Carovigno (2013–2015), stroke.
Patrick Nair, 85, Indian Roman Catholic prelate, Bishop of Meerut (1974–2008).
Antun Rudinski, 80, Serbian football manager and player (Red Star Belgrade).
Konstantin Sarsania, 49, Russian football player and manager.
Kundan Shah, 69, Indian film director (Jaane Bhi Do Yaaro), heart attack.
Gaya Singh, 74, Indian politician, Senator (1992–2004).
Jane Slowey, British charity worker, cancer.
Wacław Świerzawski, 90, Polish Roman Catholic prelate, Bishop of Sandomierz (1992–2002).
Washington SyCip, 96, Filipino accountant, founder of the Asian Institute of Management and SGV & Company.

8
Henedina Abad, 62, Filipino politician, member of the House of Representatives for Batanes (2004–2007, since 2010), cancer.
Coriún Aharonián, 77, Uruguayan electroacoustic music composer and musicologist.
Loula Anagnostaki, 88, Greek dramatist.
László Aradszky, 82, Hungarian pop singer.
Aldo Biscardi, 86, Italian football broadcaster (Il processo di Biscardi).
Mike Boland, 62, Canadian ice hockey player (Kansas City Scouts, Buffalo Sabres).
Gianni Bonagura, 91, Italian actor and voice actor (Sherlock Holmes, In Prison Awaiting Trial).
Slim Chaker, 56, Tunisian politician, Minister of Youth and Sports (2011), Minister of Finance (2015–2016) and Minister of Public Health (since 2017), heart disease.
Michel Fernando Costa, 36, Brazilian footballer (SK Slavia Prague), leukemia.
Lee Delano, 86, American actor (The Birdcage).
Mlondi Dlamini, 20, South African footballer (Maritzburg United), traffic collision.
Edna Dummerth, 93, American baseball player (All-American Girls Professional Baseball League).
Darryl Edestrand, 71, Canadian ice hockey player (Pittsburgh Penguins, Boston Bruins, Los Angeles Kings).
Merrill Heatter, 91, American screenwriter and producer (Hollywood Squares, Wacky Races, Gambit).
Mark S. Joshi, 48, British mathematician, heart attack.
Jerry Kleczka, 73, American politician, member of the U.S. House of Representatives for Wisconsin's 4th congressional district (1984–2005).
Don Lock, 81, American baseball player (Washington Senators, Philadelphia Phillies).
Gary Lowe, 83, American football player (Detroit Lions, Washington Redskins).
Beverly Reid O'Connell, 52, American federal judge, U.S. District Court for the Central District of California (2013–2017).
Grady Tate, 85, American jazz drummer and singer (Schoolhouse Rock!).
Y. A. Tittle, 90, American football player (Baltimore Colts, San Francisco 49ers, New York Giants).
Birgitta Ulfsson, 89, Finnish-Swedish actress (Rederiet).

9
Manuel Busto, 85, French racing cyclist.
Armando Calderón Sol, 69, Salvadoran politician, President (1994–1999), lung cancer.
Tony Calvento, 63, Filipino journalist (Calvento Files), multiple organ failure.
Allan Chumak, 82, Russian faith healer.
Michel Diefenbacher, 70, French politician.
Gary Flather, 80, English judge and disability rights campaigner.
ElizaBeth Gilligan, 55, American fantasy author, cancer.
Dale Hagerman, 90, American pharmacist, co-founder of Diplomat Pharmacy.
Roy Hawes, 91, American baseball player (Washington Senators).
Ben Hawkins, 73, American football player (Philadelphia Eagles).
Hessie, 81, Cuban-born French-Montenegrin textile artist.
Yoji Kondo, 84, Japanese astrophysicist and author.
Vincent La Selva, 88, American conductor, complications of dementia.
Robin Ling, 90, British orthopaedic surgeon.
Rafe Mair, 85, Canadian politician, member of the Legislative Assembly of British Columbia (1975–1981).
Victor Malu, 70, Nigerian military officer, Chief of Army Staff (1999–2001).
Mike McQueen, 67, American baseball player (Atlanta Braves, Cincinnati Reds).
Larry Paul, 65, British boxer.
Sergei Prigoda, 59, Russian football player (USSR national team) and manager.
Bill Puterbaugh, 81, American racing driver (USAC).
M. V. S. Haranatha Rao, 70, Indian playwright and actor, heart attack.
Jimmy Reid, 81, Scottish footballer (Dundee United).
Jean Rochefort, 87, French actor (Lost in La Mancha, The Phantom of Liberty, Mr. Bean's Holiday).
Fernando de Szyszlo, 92, Peruvian painter, sculptor and printmaker.
József Tóth, 88, Hungarian footballer (Csepel, national team).

10
Kassim Ahmad, 84, Malaysian writer and politician, lung illness.
David Chapman, 42, American handball player.
*Cho Jin-ho, 44, South Korean football player (Pohang Atoms, national team) and manager (Daejeon Citizen), heart attack.
Charles E. Gibson Jr., 91, American lawyer, Attorney General of Vermont (1963–1965).
Pentti Holappa, 90, Finnish poet and writer.
A. Daniel O'Neal, 81, American executive.
Sandra Ruddick, 85, American Olympic artistic gymnast (1956).
Bob Schiller, 98, American screenwriter (I Love Lucy, All in the Family, The Carol Burnett Show), Emmy winner (1971, 1978).
Lawrence Spence, 85, English cricketer (Leicestershire).
Alma Staudinger, 96, Austrian Olympic diver.
Stack Stevens, 77, English rugby union player.

11
Emmanuel Borlaza, 81, Filipino film director (Bituing Walang Ningning, Dyesebel, Darna) and writer, heart attack.
Trevor Byfield, 73, English actor (The Bill, Yesterday’s Dreams, GoldenEye), pneumonia.
Don Pedro Colley, 79, American actor (The Dukes of Hazzard, THX 1138, Beneath the Planet of the Apes), cancer.
John Fitzallen, 82, Australian football player (Longford).
James R. Ford, 91, American politician, Mayor of Tallahassee, Florida (1972–1986).
Chikara Hashimoto, 83, Japanese baseball player and actor (Fist of Fury), lung cancer.
Dick Hewitt, 74, English footballer (Barnsley, York City).
Paul Hufnagle, 81, American politician and businessman, Member of Minnesota House of Representatives (1991–1993).
Sir Clifford Husbands, 91, Barbadian politician and judge, Governor-General (1996–2011).
Jeremy, 2, British left-coiled snail.
Gloria Johnson-Powell, 81, American child psychiatrist.
Lika Kavzharadze, 57, Georgian actress (The Wishing Tree).
Karl-Heinz Kipp, 93, Swiss-German billionaire department store and hotel owner.
Paolo Lunardon, 87, Italian clergyman, Abbot of San Paolo fuori le mura (1997–2005).
Betty Moczynski, 91, American baseball player (All-American Girls Professional Baseball League).
Christiane Mora, 78, French politician and historian, MP (1981–1992) and Mayor of Loches (1989–1995).
Nélio José Nicolai, 77, Brazilian electrotechnician, inventor of Caller ID.
Shen Zuyan, 82, Chinese physicist.
Sir Richard Swinburn, 79, British army general, Commander UK Field Army (1994–1995).

12
Derek Blackburn, 83, Canadian politician, MP for Brant (1971–1993).
Joan Blos, 89, American author.
Simon Clarke, 79, English rugby union player (national team).
Muntaka Connmassie, 71, Nigerian jurist, Supreme Court (2008–2016).
Margarita D'Amico, 79, Venezuelan journalist and academic.
Keith Doyle, 92, Australian politician, member of the New South Wales Legislative Assembly for Vaucluse (1965–1978).
Grape-kun, 21, Japanese Humboldt penguin.
Bo Holmström, 78, Swedish journalist (SVT, TV4).
Hu Bo, 29, Chinese novelist and film director, suicide.
Ed Long, 83, American politician, member of the Oklahoma Senate (1988–1996).
Andy McGhee, 89, American jazz saxophonist.
Erwin Moser, 63, Austrian author.
Horst Posdorf, 69, German politician, MEP (2005–2009).
Robert Lynn Pruett, 38, American murderer, execution by lethal injection.

13
Bernd Bonwetsch, 76, German historian, founding director of German Historical Institute Moscow.
Betty Campbell, 82, Welsh community activist and head teacher.
Satish Chandra, 94, Indian historian (medieval India).
Lady Jean Fforde, 96, British aristocrat and codebreaker.
Pierre Hanon, 80, Belgian footballer (national team, Anderlecht).
William Lombardy, 79, American chess grandmaster, heart attack.
Ted Z. Robertson, 96, American judge, Texas Supreme Court justice (1982–1988).
Iain Rogerson, 56, British actor (Coronation Street), complications from diabetes.
P. S. Soosaithasan, 83, Sri Lankan politician, MP for Mannar (1977–1983).
Albert Zafy, 90, Malagasy politician, President (1993–1996), stroke.

14
Wolfgang Bötsch, 79, German politician, MP (1976–2005) and Federal Minister of Post and Telecommunications (1993–1997).
Lazhar Bououni, 69, Tunisian politician and professor, Minister of Higher Education and Research (2004–2010) and Justice (2010–2011), President of University of Sousse (1990–1995) and University of Manouba (1991–2001).
Emmanuel Aboagye Didieye, 40, Ghanaian politician, MP for Afram Plains North (2009–2017).
Patrick Haslam, 69, British racehorse trainer, motor neurone disease.
Inside Information, 26, American racehorse.
Fulgence Werner Le Roy, 93, Belgian-born South African Roman Catholic prelate, Bishop of Polokwane (1988–2000).
Yambo Ouologuem, 77, Malian writer.
Lourdes Quisumbing, 96, Filipino politician, Secretary of Education, Culture and Sports (1986–1989).
Marian Cannon Schlesinger, 105, American artist and author.
Daniel Webb, 28, American baseball player (Chicago White Sox), ATV collision.
Richard Wilbur, 96, American poet and literary translator, Pulitzer Prize winner (1957, 1989).

15
Chinggoy Alonzo, 67, Filipino actor, cancer.
Dave Bry, 46, American music journalist and editor (Vibe, Spin, The Awl), cancer.
Cathy Elliott, 60, Canadian playwright, actress and composer, struck by a car.
Choirul Huda, 38, Indonesian footballer (Persela Lamongan), cardiac arrest due to collision with teammate.
Burrhead Jones, 80, American professional wrestler (WWWF, CCW, CWA).
Shamsher Khan, 84, Indian Olympic swimmer (1956).
Peter Lumsden, 88, British racing driver.
Gonzalo Martínez Corbalá, 89, Mexican politician and diplomat, MP (1964–1967, 1988–1990), Senator (1982–1988), Governor of San Luis Potosí (1991–1992).
Sir Bert Massie, 68, British disability rights campaigner, Chairman of Disability Rights Commission (2000–2007), cancer.
Xavier Johnsai Munyongani, 67, Zimbabwean Roman Catholic prelate, Bishop of Gweru (since 2013).
Miloš Radulović, 88, Montenegrin politician, President of Yugoslavia (1993).
Alison Robins, 97, British military communications listener (Y-stations).
Rose Schwarz, 82, German missionary.
Hernán Silva, 68, Chilean football referee.
Herbert Suchiang, 86, Indian politician, cardiac arrest.
Lekh Tandon, 88, Indian film director (Professor, Ek Baar Kaho, Amrapali) and actor (Swades, Chennai Express).
Serge Thion, 75, French sociologist and Holocaust denier, member of French National Center for Scientific Research (1971–2000).
William Turnage, 74, American conservationist, business manager of Ansel Adams, cancer.

16
John Andreason, 88, American politician, member of the Idaho Senate (1995–2012), liver cancer.
Kevin Cadle, 62, American-born British basketball coach (Kingston Kings, British national team) and presenter (Sky Sports).
Daphne Caruana Galizia, 53, Maltese blogger and journalist (Panama Papers), car bomb.
Dharmakkan Dhanaraj, 67, Indian Christian theologian.
Roy Dotrice, 94, British actor (Amadeus, A Moon for the Misbegotten, Game of Thrones), Tony winner (2000).
John Dunsworth, 71, Canadian actor (Trailer Park Boys, Haven, The Shipping News), complications from thrombotic thrombocytopenic purpura.
Fedor Glushchenko, 73, Russian conductor and violinist.
Isnilon Hapilon, 51, Filipino Islamist militant (MNLF, Al-Qaeda, Abu Sayyaf), shot.
Sean Hughes, 51, Irish comedian (Never Mind the Buzzcocks, Sean's Show) and actor (The Last Detective), cirrhosis.
Koichi Kishi, 77, Japanese politician, Mayor of Kaneyama (1971–1998) and member of the House of Councillors (1998–2016).
Ma Lin, 92, Hong Kong biochemist, Vice-Chancellor of the Chinese University of Hong Kong (1978–1987).
Omar Maute, 37, Filipino Islamist militant (Maute group), shot.
Ajmal Mian, 83, Pakistani jurist, Chief Justice (1997–1999).
David Pettifor, 72, British metallurgist.
Marvin Rodríguez, 82, Costa Rican football player and coach (national team, C.S.D. Municipal, Saprissa).
Phillip V. Sanchez, 88, American diplomat, ambassador to Honduras (1973–1976) and Colombia (1976–1977).
Iain Shedden, 60, Scottish-Australian musician (The Saints) and journalist (The Australian), laryngeal cancer.
Anthony Simonds-Gooding, 80, Irish executive.
Heather Slade-Lipkin, 70, English pianist, harpsichordist and music teacher.
Harriette Thompson, 94, American pianist.
Yan Shunkai, 80, Chinese comedian, actor (The True Story of Ah Q) and film director.

17
Ed Barnowski, 74, American baseball player (Baltimore Orioles).
Ian Baxter, 80, British army officer.
Robert Butow, 93, American historian.
Danielle Darrieux, 100, French actress (The Young Girls of Rochefort, Persepolis, The Earrings of Madame de…) and singer, complications from a fall.
Gord Downie, 53, Canadian musician (The Tragically Hip) and activist (Lake Ontario Waterkeeper, residential school reconciliation), glioblastoma.
Mychael Knight, 39, American fashion designer (Project Runway).
Ryszard Kowalczyk, 80, Polish scientist and Soviet dissident.
Ingvar Lidholm, 96, Swedish composer.
Michele Marsh, 63, American television journalist, breast cancer.
Giuseppe Massa, 69, Italian footballer (Inter Milan, S.S.C. Napoli).
Julian May, 86, American science fiction writer (The Many-Colored Land).
Dick Morley, 84, American electrical engineer, inventor of the programmable logic controller.
Dunc Rousseau, 72, Canadian ice hockey player (Winnipeg Jets), cancer.
Harry Stradling Jr., 92, American cinematographer (The Way We Were, Micki + Maude, 1776).

18
Gregory Baum, 94, Canadian theologian.
Brent Briscoe, 56, American actor (Twin Peaks, A Simple Plan, Sling Blade) and screenwriter, complications from a fall.
Eamonn Campbell, 70, Irish musician (The Dubliners).
Arlie F. Culp, 91, American politician.
Helen DeVos, 90, American philanthropist (Helen DeVos Children's Hospital), stroke complications.
Jerry Helluin, 88, American football player (Green Bay Packers, Cleveland Browns).
Phil Miller, 68, English guitarist, cancer.
Dorothy Morrison, 98, American child actress (The Champeen, Seein' Things, Isn't Life Terrible?).
Taizo Nishimuro, 81, Japanese businessman (Japan Post Holdings, Toshiba, Tokyo Stock Exchange).
Eva Paulusová-Benešová, 80, Czech Olympic cross-country skier.
Marino Perani, 77, Italian football manager and player (Bologna, national team).
John Phillips, 83, English cricketer (Kent).
Sir Christopher Pitchford, 70, British jurist, Lord Justice of Appeal (2010–2017), motor neurone disease.
Unity Spencer, 87, British artist.
Ricardo Vidal, 86, Filipino Roman Catholic prelate and cardinal, Archbishop of Lipa (1973–1981) and Cebu (1981–2010), President of the Catholic Bishops' Conference (1986–1987), sepsis.
Ram Singh Yadav, 74, Indian politician, heart attack.
Yeoh Tiong Lay, 87, Malaysian businessman (YTL).
Issam Zahreddine, 56, Syrian Republican Guard major general (Siege of Deir ez-Zor), landmine explosion.

19
Jeanne Brousse, 96, French resistance member.
Edmund Cotter, 90, New Zealand mountaineer.
Dick DiBiaso, 76, American college basketball coach (Stanford). 
Ken Gowers, 81, English rugby league player (Swinton, Great Britain).
Calvin Hultman, 76, American politician, member of the Iowa Senate (1973–1991).
Willie Lee, 67, American football player (Kansas City Chiefs), heart attack.
Umberto Lenzi, 86, Italian film director (Cannibal Ferox, Nightmare City, Eaten Alive!).
Miguel Ángel Loayza, 77, Peruvian football player (FC Barcelona, Boca Juniors, Deportivo Cali).
Castor Paul Msemwa, 62, Tanzanian Roman Catholic prelate, Bishop of Tunduru-Masasi (since 2005).
Michael Pitfield, 80, Canadian politician, Clerk of the Privy Council (1975–1979, 1980–1982) and Senator (1982–2010), Parkinson's disease.
Brian Riley, 80, English footballer (Bolton Wanderers).

20
Fay Chiang, 65, American poet, complications from cancer.
Amal Dutta, 84, Indian politician.
Ugo Fangareggi, 79, Italian actor (L'armata Brancaleone), voice actor and comedian, Parkinson's disease.
Rudolf Gorenflo, 87, German mathematician.
Stan Kowalski, 91, American professional wrestler (AWA, NWA Tri-State, Stampede Wrestling).
Boris Lindqvist, 76, Swedish rock singer.
Federico Luppi, 81, Argentine-Spanish actor (Nobody Will Speak of Us When We're Dead, Pan's Labyrinth, Men with Guns).
Russell Mawby, 89, American businessman, CEO of W. K. Kellogg Foundation (1970–1996).
Judith McGrath, 70, Australian actress (Prisoner, A Country Practice, All Saints).
Dick Noel, 90, American band singer ("Count Every Star").
Justin Reed, 35, American basketball player (Ole Miss Rebels, Boston Celtics, Minnesota Timberwolves), angiosarcoma.
Betty Bone Schiess, 94, American Episcopal priest.
Roland Ströhm, 89, Swedish Olympic cyclist.
Mustapha Tlili, 80, Tunisian novelist.
Thuravoor Viswambharan, 74, Indian Vedic scholar and writer.

21
Martin Eric Ain, 50, American-born Swiss bassist (Hellhammer, Celtic Frost) and entrepreneur, heart attack.
Donald Bain, 82, American writer (Coffee, Tea or Me?), heart failure.
Rosaura Barahona, 75, Mexican journalist and feminist writer, pulmonary disease.
Denise P. Barlow, 67, British geneticist.
Kazimierz Chodakowski, 88, Polish Olympic ice hockey player (1952, 1956), (ŁKS Łódź).
Chuck Churn, 87, American baseball player (Pittsburgh Pirates, Cleveland Indians, Los Angeles Dodgers).
Emilio D'Amore, 101, Italian politician, Deputy (1948–1958, 1963–1968).
Robert Getchell, 81, American screenwriter (Alice Doesn't Live Here Anymore, Bound for Glory, The Client).
Audrey Hancock, 98, British Olympic swimmer (1936).
Nol Hendriks, 80, Dutch businessman and football executive (Roda JC), brain hemorrhage.
Rosemary Leach, 81, English actress (A Room with a View, The Roads to Freedom, The Plague Dogs).
John Morrow, 84, American football player (Cleveland Browns, Los Angeles Rams).
Lech Ordon, 88, Polish actor (Letters to Santa).
Max Pfister, 85, Swiss linguist.
Juan de Dios Pueblos, 74, Filipino Roman Catholic prelate, Bishop of Kidapawan (1987–1995) and Butuan (since 1995).
Herb Raybourn, 82, American baseball scout (New York Yankees).
Pat Shovelin, 41, Irish Gaelic football coach (Donegal), cancer.
Gilbert Stork, 95, American chemist.
Herbert Strabel, 90, German art director (Cabaret, The NeverEnding Story, Enemy Mine), Oscar winner (1973).
Tom van Vollenhoven, 82, South African rugby union (national team) and rugby league player (St Helens).

22
Piergiuseppe D'Andreamatteo, 73, Italian politician, Deputy (1992–1994).
Christopher Grant, 81, English cricketer (Nottinghamshire).
Atle Hammer, 85, Norwegian jazz musician.
Al Hurricane, 81, American singer and songwriter, complications from prostate cancer.
Emu Lehtinen, 70, Finnish record dealer, leukemia.
Patricia Llewellyn, 55, British television producer (The Naked Chef, Ramsay's Kitchen Nightmares), BAFTA (2001, 2005, 2008) and Emmy winner (2006), breast cancer.
Baldo Marro, 69, Filipino actor and director.
Ram Mukherjee, 84, Indian film director (Hum Hindustani, Ek Bar Mooskura Do, Leader).
Fernand Picot, 87, French racing cyclist.
Scott Putesky, 49, American guitarist (Marilyn Manson), colon cancer.
Walter Babington Thomas, 98, New Zealand-born British army officer, GOC Far East Land Forces (1970–1971).
Geraldo João Paulo Roger Verdier, 80, French-born Brazilian Roman Catholic prelate, Bishop of Guajará-Mirim (1980–2011), hemorrhagic stroke.
Chuck Weber, 87, American football player (Cleveland Browns, Philadelphia Eagles).
Paul J. Weitz, 85, American astronaut (Skylab 2, STS-6), myelodysplastic syndrome.
George Young, 70, Scottish-born Australian musician (The Easybeats), songwriter ("Friday on My Mind", "Love Is in the Air"), and producer (AC/DC).

23
Alinghi, 16, Australian racehorse, foaling complications.
Corrado Böhm, 94, Italian computer scientist.
Joe Corcoran, 77, Irish Gaelic football player (Mayo GAA).
Reinhold Durnthaler, 74, Austrian bobsledder, world champion (1967), Olympic silver medallist (1964, 1968).
Pyotr Gorelikov, 85, Russian Olympic sailor.
Gordon A. Haaland, 77, American academic.
Anthony Hallam, 83, British geologist.
Mila Hernando, 60, Spanish diplomat, Ambassador to Lebanon (2012–2017), cancer.
Athanassios Kalogiannis, 52, Greek Olympic hurdler (1984, 1992) and fashion photographer, pulmonary edema.
Walter Lassally, 90, German-born British-Greek cinematographer (Zorba the Greek, Oedipus the King, Tom Jones), Oscar winner (1965).
John Mattock, 91, British rose grower.
Joyce McLaughlin, 78, American mathematician.
Hamid Ali Mirza, 77, Pakistani judge.
Mary Nissenson, 65, American television journalist, septic shock.
Gordon Ogilvie, 83, New Zealand historian (Canterbury region) and biographer (Richard Pearse, Denis Glover).
Iona Opie, 94, British folklorist.
Mari Lyn Salvador, 74, American anthropologist and museum director (San Diego Museum of Man, Hearst Museum).
Charles Sims, 80, American mathematician.
Zenon Ważny, 87, Polish Olympic pole vaulter (1956).

24
M. K. Anwar, 84, Bangladeshi politician, Minister of Agriculture (2001–2006).
Ebrahim Ashtiani, 75, Iranian footballer (Persepolis, national team), heart disease.
Sir Peter Bairsto, 91, British air marshal, Deputy Commander in Chief Strike Command (1981–1984).
Glenn Barr, 75, Northern Irish politician (UDA) and advocate, member of Northern Ireland Assembly and Constitutional Convention.
Amal Bayou, 58–60, Libyan microbiologist and politician, member of the House of Representatives.
Inga Borg, 92, Swedish writer (Plupp).
Willie Chan, 76, Malaysian-born Hong Kong film producer and talent manager (Jackie Chan, Edison Chen).
Ingetraut Dahlberg, 90, German information scientist and philosopher, developer of Information Coding Classification.
Girija Devi, 88, Indian thumri singer, Padma Vibhushan (2016), cardiac arrest.
Fats Domino, 89, American Hall of Fame pianist and singer-songwriter ("Blueberry Hill", "Ain't That a Shame", "I'm Walkin'").
Michael Patrick Driscoll, 78, American Roman Catholic prelate, Bishop of Boise (1999–2014).
Alan Eddy, 90, British biochemist.
Fu Quanxiang, 94, Chinese Yue opera actress.
Tony Garrett, 99, British executive, chairman of Imperial Tobacco (1973-1979).
Robert Guillaume, 89, American actor and singer (Benson, The Lion King, Sports Night), Emmy winner (1979, 1985), prostate cancer.
Clayton Howard, 83, British make-up artist.
Sana Iqbal, 29, Indian cross-country cyclist and anti-suicide activist, traffic collision.
Jane Juska, 84, American writer.
Brady Keys, 81, American football player (Pittsburgh Steelers, Minnesota Vikings, St. Louis Cardinals) and businessman.
Otto Kraus, 87, German arachnologist and myriapodologist.
Eric Kipping, 92, Canadian politician.
Andrew W. Lewis, 74, American medievalist.
Peter Lötscher, 76, Swiss Olympic fencer.
Michael Proctor, 88, English botanist.
Brendan O'Kelly, 89, Irish Olympic footballer
Isabel Quintanilla, 79, Spanish visual artist.
I. V. Sasi, 69, Indian film director (Devasuram), heart attack.
Mahama Sawadogo, 63, Burkinabé politician, High Commissioner of Kadiogo Province (1984–1986) and member of the National Assembly (since 1992).

25
Mohamed Abshir Muse, 91, Somali military officer, commander of Somali Police Force (1960–1969) and leader of SSDF (1991–1998).
Jack Bannon, 77, American actor (Lou Grant, Petticoat Junction, Little Big Man).
Robert Blakeley, 95, American graphic designer (fallout shelter sign).
Vilnis Edvīns Bresis, 79, Latvian politician, Chairman of the Council of Ministers of the Latvian SSR (1988–1990).
Ronald Breslow, 86, American chemist and professor (Columbia University), cancer.
Ian Cathie, 85, Australian politician, Victorian MLA (1976–1988).
Maud Linder, 93, French journalist, film historian and documentary film director.
Lu Guanqiu, 72, Chinese billionaire automotive manufacturer, chairman and co-founder of Wanxiang.
Peter MacGregor-Scott, 69, British film producer (Batman Forever, The Fugitive, Still Smokin), injuries sustained in traffic collision.
Joseph Mahn Erie, 92, Myanmar Roman Catholic prelate, Bishop of Bassein (1968–1982).
Sir John Manduell, 89, South African-born British composer and educator (Royal Northern College of Music).
John Mollo, 86, British costume designer (Star Wars, Alien, Gandhi), Oscar winner (1978, 1983), vascular dementia.
Donnchadh Ó Corráin, 75, Irish historian (vikings, Medieval ages, Hiberno-Normans).
Pinito del Oro, 86, Spanish trapeze artist (Ringling Bros. and Barnum & Bailey Circus).
Ross Powell, 49, American baseball player (Cincinnati Reds, Houston Astros, Pittsburgh Pirates), carbon monoxide poisoning.
Gas Ronda, 91, American drag racer.
Ben Shephard, 69, English historian and writer.
Vincent Warren, 79, American-Canadian dance historian and lecturer.
Jim Welch, 79, American football player (Baltimore Colts).

26
Ali Ashraf Darvishian, 76, Iranian writer and democracy activist.
Awurama Badu, 72, Ghanaian highlife musician.
George Conzemius, 81, American politician, member of the Minnesota Senate (1967-1977).
Simon Fitzmaurice, 43, Irish filmmaker, motor neurone disease.
André Gauthier, 82, Canadian monument sculptor and designer.
Arnett E. Girardeau, 88, American politician, member of the Florida House of Representatives (1976–1982) and Senate (1983–1992).
Juliette, 91, Canadian singer and television host.
Sir Gavin Laird, 84, Scottish trade unionist.
Ian McLeod, 63, South African football referee.
Shea Norman, 45, American gospel singer, diabetes.
Nelly Olin, 76, French politician, Mayor of Garges-lès-Gonesse and Senator (1995–2004), Minister of Environment (2005–2007).
Barry Roberts, 84, Australian rugby union player (Manly RUFC).
Richard M. Ryckman, 80, American psychologist.
Sir Reginald Secondé, 95, British diplomat, Ambassador to Chile, Romania and Venezuela.
Thomas Smales, 83, English rugby league player (national team) and coach (Castleford Tigers, Featherstone Rovers).
Geoff Tootill, 95, British computer scientist.
Abdul Karim Telgi, 56, Indian forger.
Stephen Toulouse, 45, American policy specialist and public relations manager (Microsoft, Xbox Live), abdominal hemorrhage.

27
Lewis Golden, 94, English army officer and executive (Everest Home Improvement).
Hans Kraay Sr., 81, Dutch football player (DOS) and manager (Feyenoord).
Ladislav Kubík, 71, Czech-born American composer.
Punathil Kunjabdulla, 77, Indian writer (Smarakasilakal).
Dieter Kurrat, 75, German football player and manager (Borussia Dortmund).
Peter Lawrenson, 84, British electrical engineer.
Cecil Moss, 92, South African rugby union player (national team).
David Reid, 84, Australian politician, member of the Western Australian Legislative Assembly for Blackwood (1971–1972), Senator for Western Australia (1974).
David Shedden, 73, Scottish rugby union player (national team).
Digamber Singh, 66, Indian politician, cancer.
Abdoulaye Soulama, 37, Burkinabé footballer (ASFA Yennenga, Denizlispor, national team).
Deon Stewardson, 66, South African actor (Wild at Heart), suicide.
Inkululeko Suntele, 23, Lesothan Olympic boxer, stabbed.
Katalin Szőke, 82, Hungarian swimmer, Olympic champion (1952).
Joe Taub, 88, American business executive (Automatic Data Processing) and co-owner of the New Jersey Nets.
David Vaughan, 93, American dance historian, complications from prostate cancer.

28
Yvonne Baseden, 95, French-born British Special Operations Executive agent.
Ronald Getoor, 88, American mathematician.
Josaphat-Robert Large, 74, Haitian-American poet, novelist and art critic, Prix littéraire des Caraïbes (2003).
Roger Lockyer, 89, British historian.
Al Oster, 92, Canadian folk singer.
Leif Ottersen, 88, Norwegian Lutheran priest.
Mitchell Peters, 82, American timpanist.
Bernard Roy, 83, French mathematician.
Manuel Sanchís Martínez, 79, Spanish footballer (national team, Real Madrid).
Willy Schroeders, 84, Belgian racing cyclist.

29
Muhal Richard Abrams, 87, American jazz pianist.
Cecil Austen, 98, Australian cricketer and football player.
Dennis Banks, 80, American indigenous activist and actor (Thunderheart, The Last of the Mohicans), co-founder of American Indian Movement, complications from heart surgery.
Thelma Boughner, 99, Canadian Olympic diver (1936).
Richard E. Cavazos, 88, American army general, Commanding General of FORSCOM (1982–1984), Alzheimer's disease.
Claude Dulong, 95, French historian.
Metin Ersoy, 83, Turkish singer.
Roly Green, 90, New Zealand rugby union player (South Canterbury).
Richard Hambleton, 65, Canadian street artist, cancer.
Frank Holder, 92, Guyanese jazz singer and percussionist.
Władysław Kowalski, 81, Polish actor.
Steve Landen, 64, American bridge player, hypothermia.
Tony Madigan, 87, Australian boxer and rugby union player, Olympic bronze medalist (1960).
Billy Mize, 88, American steel guitarist, band leader and vocalist.
Didier Motchane, 86, French politician, MEP (1979–1989), cancer.
Manfredi Nicoletti, 87, Italian architect (Helicoidal Skyscraper, Airport of Catania, Kazakhstan Central Concert Hall).
Linda Nochlin, 86, American art historian.
Juanita Quigley, 86, American child actress.
Atluri Purnachandra Rao, 92, Indian film producer (Venky).
Al Richter, 90, American baseball player (Boston Red Sox).
Peter Schutz, 87, German-born American businessman (Porsche), Alzheimer's disease.
Sir Ninian Stephen, 94, Australian judge, Governor-General (1982–1989), Justice of the High Court (1972–1982).
Daniel Te'o-Nesheim, 30, American Samoan football player (Philadelphia Eagles, Tampa Bay Buccaneers).

30
Candy Atherton, 62, British politician, MP for Falmouth and Camborne (1997–2005).
Fred Beckey, 94, American rock climber, mountaineer and author.
Algimantas Butnorius, 70, Lithuanian chess Grandmaster (2007) and World Senior Champion (2007).
Frank Doran, 68, British politician, MP for Aberdeen South (1987–1992) and Aberdeen North (1997–2015).
János Halász, 88, Hungarian Olympic basketball player (1948).
*Kim Joo-hyuk, 45, South Korean actor (The Servant, My Wife Got Married, Confidential Assignment), traffic collision.
Cornelius Korir, 67, Kenyan Roman Catholic prelate, Bishop of Eldoret (since 1990).
James D. Martin, 99, American politician, member of the U.S. House of Representatives for Alabama's 7th congressional district (1965–1967).
Judy Martz, 74, American politician, Governor of Montana (2001–2005), Olympic speed skater (1964), pancreatic cancer.
Salvador Minuchin, 96, Argentine-American psychotherapist, developer of structural family therapy, heart disease.
Eugène Parlier, 88, Swiss footballer (Servette, Urania Genève Sport, Biel-Bienne).
Melanmai Ponnusamy, 66, Indian writer, heart attack.
Mary Reveley, 77, British racehorse trainer.
M. V. Sridhar, 51, Indian cricketer (Hyderabad), heart attack.
Daniel Viglietti, 78, Uruguayan folk singer, guitarist, composer and political activist.
Abbas Zandi, 87, Iranian Olympic freestyle wrestler (1948, 1952, 1956) and World champion (1954).

31
Wolfgang Achtner, 60, German theologian, heart attack.
Weston Bate, 93, Australian historian.
William Amherst Vanderbilt Cecil, 89, American businessman (The Biltmore Company).
Mircea Drăgan, 85, Romanian film director (Setea, Lupeni 29, Explosion).
Norman Hardie, 92, New Zealand mountaineer.
Fanya Heller, 93, Ukrainian-born American Holocaust survivor and author.
Myron P. Lotto, 92, American politician, member of the Wisconsin Senate (1969-1973).
Terry McCashin, 73, New Zealand businessman (McCashin's Brewery) and rugby union player (national team, Wellington).
Clare McLaren-Throckmorton, 82, British barrister.
Red Murrell, 84, American basketball player (Drake University), heart disease.
Mario das Neves, 66, Argentine politician, Governor of Chubut (2003–2011, since 2015).
Papi Oviedo, 79, Cuban tresero.
Derek Robinson, 90, British trade unionist.
Stefano Salvatori, 49, Italian footballer (Milan, Fiorentina), cancer.
Colin Simpson, 86, English journalist and author.
Bob Talbot, 89, American baseball player (Chicago Cubs).
Abubakari Yakubu, 35, Ghanaian footballer (Ajax, Vitesse, national team).

References 

2017-10
 10